San Marcello Piteglio is a comune (municipality) in the Province of Pistoia in Tuscany, Italy. It was created in 2016 after the merger of the former communes of San Marcello Pistoiese and Piteglio. The hamlet of Gavinana is notable for the site at which Francesco Ferrucio was captured and executed in the 16th-century, and housing the patriotic 19th-century Equestrian Monument to Ferrucio.

Science
San Marcello is home to the Pistoia Mountains Astronomical Observatory.

Twin towns
 
 La Güera, Western Sahara
 Saône, France
 Saint-Martin-du-Tertre, France, since 1987

References

External links
  Official website